Bazir Kola (also Romanized as Bāzīr Kolā; also known as Bāzīār Kolā) is a village in Sharq va Gharb-e Shirgah Rural District, North Savadkuh County, Mazandaran Province, Iran. At the 2006 census, its population was 84, in 24 families.

References 

Populated places in Savadkuh County